The 12007/08 Chennai Central–Mysuru Junction Shatabdi Express is a Superfast Express train of the Shatabdi Express category belonging to Indian Railways, Southern Railway zone, that runs between Chennai Central and Mysuru Junction in India. It is the first Shatabdi Express in South India.

It operates as train number 12007 from Chennai Central to Mysuru Junction, and as train number 12008 in the reverse direction while also connecting the capital cities of the states of Tamil Nadu and Karnataka.

Rake composition & coaches
The 12007/08 Chennai Central–Mysuru Junction Shatabdi Express presently has 1 Anubhuti class, 2 Executive class, 12 AC chair car and 2 end-on generator coaches. It does not carry a pantry car coach but catering is arranged on board the train AC 3 Tier.

As is customary with most train services in India, the coach composition may be amended at the discretion of Indian Railways depending on demand.

The train runs with modern LHB coaches

The coaches in Light blue color indicate AC Chair Cars and the coaches in Violet color indicate Executive and Anubhuti Classes.

Service

Schedule
The schedule of this 12007/12008 MGR Chennai Central - Mysuru Shatabdi Express is given below:-

Routing
The 12007/08 Chennai Central–Mysuru Junction Shatabdi Express runs from Chennai Central to Mysuru Junction with halts at Katpadi & KSR Bengaluru.

Being a Shatabdi-class train, it returns to its originating station, Chennai Central, at the end of the day.

Loco link
Prior end 2017 due to partial electrification of the route, an Arakkonam or Royapuram-based WAP-4 or WAP-7 would haul the train between Chennai Central & KSR Bengaluru Station handing over to a Hubli-based WDP-4 which would then power the train up to Mysuru Junction.

Since the entire route is now completely electrified, the train is now hauled end to end by a Royapuram or Erode based WAP-7 locomotive which are equipped with head-on generation(HOG) technology.

Gallery

References

External links

Shatabdi Express trains
Rail transport in Tamil Nadu
Rail transport in Karnataka
Railway services introduced in 1994
Transport in Chennai
Transport in Mysore